The virgin birth of Jesus is the Christian doctrine that Jesus was conceived by his mother, Mary, through the power of the Holy Spirit and without sexual intercourse. The ancient world had no understanding that male semen and female ovum were both needed to form a fetus; this cultural milieu was conducive to miraculous birth stories, and tales of virgin birth and the impregnation of mortal women by deities were well known in the 1st-century Greco-Roman world and Second Temple Jewish works. 

Christians regard the doctrine as an explanation of the mixture of the human and divine natures of Jesus. The Eastern Orthodox Churches accept the doctrine as authoritative by reason of its inclusion in the Nicene Creed, and the Catholic Church holds it authoritative for faith through the Apostles' Creed as well as the Nicene. Nevertheless, there are many contemporary churches in which it is considered orthodox to accept the virgin birth but not heretical to deny it.

The Quran asserts the virgin birth of Jesus, deriving its account from the 2nd century AD Protoevangelium of James, but denies the Trinitarian implications of the gospel story (Jesus is a messenger of God but also a human being and not the Second Person of the Christian Trinity).

New Testament narratives: Matthew and Luke

Matthew 1:18-27

18: Now the birth of Jesus the Messiah took place in this way. When his mother Mary had been engaged to Joseph, but before they lived together, she was found to be with child from the Holy Spirit.
19: Her husband Joseph, being a righteous man and unwilling to expose her to public disgrace, planned to dismiss her quietly.
20: But just when he had resolved to do this, an angel of the Lord appeared to him in a dream and said, "Joseph, son of David, do not be afraid to take Mary as your wife, for the child conceived in her is from the Holy Spirit. 
21: She will bear a son, and you are to name him Jesus, for he will save his people from their sins."
22: All this took place to fulfill what had been spoken by the Lord through the prophet: 
23: "Look, the virgin shall conceive and bear a son, and they shall name him Emmanuel," which means, "God is with us." 
24: When Joseph awoke from sleep, he did as the angel of the Lord commanded him; he took her as his wife, 
25: but had no marital relations with her until she had borne a son; and he named him Jesus.

Luke 1:26-38

26: In the sixth month the angel Gabriel was sent by God to a town in Galilee called Nazareth,
27: to a virgin engaged to a man whose name was Joseph, of the house of David. The virgin's name was Mary.
28: And he came to her and said, "Greetings, favored one! The Lord is with you."
29: But she was much perplexed by his words and pondered what sort of greeting this might be.
30: The angel said to her, "Do not be afraid, Mary, for you have found favor with God.
31: And now, you will conceive in your womb and bear a son, and you will name him Jesus.
32: He will be great, and will be called the Son of the Most High, and the Lord God will give to him the throne of his ancestor David. 
33: He will reign over the house of Jacob forever, and of his kingdom there will be no end."
34: Mary said to the angel, "How can this be, since I am a virgin?"
35: The angel said to her, "The Holy Spirit will come upon you, and the power of the Most High will overshadow you; therefore the child to be born will be holy; he will be called Son of God.
36: And now, your relative Elizabeth in her old age has also conceived a son; and this is the sixth month for her who was said to be barren.
37: For nothing will be impossible with God."
38: Then Mary said, "Here am I, the servant of the Lord; let it be with me according to your word." Then the angel departed from her.

Texts
In the entire Christian corpus, the virgin birth is found only in the Gospel of Matthew and the Gospel of Luke. The two agree that Mary's husband was named Joseph, that he was of the Davidic line, and that he played no role in Jesus's divine conception, but beyond this they are very different. Matthew has no census, shepherds, or presentation in the temple, and implies that Joseph and Mary are living in Bethlehem at the time of the birth, while Luke has no magi, flight into Egypt or massacre of the infants, and states that Joseph lives in Nazareth.

Matthew underlines the virginity of Mary by references to the Book of Isaiah (using the Greek translation in the Septuagint, rather than the mostly Hebrew Masoretic Text) and by his narrative statement that Joseph had no sexual relations with her until after the birth (a choice of words which leaves open the possibility that they did have relations after that).
Luke introduces Mary as a virgin, describes her puzzlement at being told she will bear a child despite her lack of sexual experience, and informs the reader that this pregnancy is to be effected through God's Holy Spirit.

There is a serious debate as to whether Luke's nativity story is an original part of his gospel. Chapters 1 and 2 are written in a style quite different from the rest of the gospel, and the dependence of the birth narrative on the Greek Septuagint is absent from the remainder. There are strong Lukan motifs in Luke 1–2, but differences are equally striking—Jesus's identity as "son of David", for example, is a prominent theme of the birth narrative, but not in the rest of the gospel. In the early part of the 2nd century the gnostic theologian Marcion produced a version of Luke lacking these two chapters, and although he is generally accused of having cut them out of a longer text more like our own, genealogies and birth narratives are also absent from Mark and John.

Cultural context

Matthew 1:18 says that Mary was betrothed (engaged) to Joseph. She would have been twelve years old or a little less at the time of events described in the gospels, as under Jewish law betrothal was only possible for minors, which for girls meant aged under twelve or prior to the first mense, whichever came first. According to custom the wedding would take place twelve months later, after which the groom would take his bride from her father's house to his own. A betrothed girl who had sex with a man other than her husband-to-be was considered an adulteress. If tried before a tribunal both she and the young man would be stoned to death, but it was possible for her betrothed husband to issue a document of repudiation, and this, according to Matthew, was the course Joseph wished to take prior to the visitation by the angel. 

The most likely cultural context for both Matthew and Luke is Jewish Christian or mixed Gentile/Jewish-Christian circles rooted in Jewish tradition. These readers would have known that the Roman Senate had declared Julius Caesar a god and his successor Augustus to be divi filius, the Son of God before he became a god himself on his death in AD 14; this remained the pattern for later emperors. Imperial divinity was accompanied by suitable miraculous birth stories, with Augustus being fathered by the god Apollo while his human mother slept, and her human husband being granted a dream in which he saw the sun rise from her womb, and inscriptions even described the news of the divine imperial birth as evangelia, the gospel. The virgin birth of Jesus was thus a direct challenge to a central claim of Roman imperial theology, namely the divine conception and descent of the emperors. 

Matthew's genealogy, tracing Jesus's Davidic descent, was intended for Jews, while his virgin birth story was intended for a Greco-Roman audience familiar with virgin birth stories and stories of women impregnated by gods. The ancient world had no understanding that male semen and female ovum were both needed to form a fetus; instead they thought that the male contribution in reproduction consisted of some sort of formative or generative principle, while Mary's bodily fluids would provide all the matter that was needed for Jesus's bodily form, including his male sex. This cultural milieu was conducive to miraculous birth stories – they were common in biblical tradition going back to Abraham and Sarah (and the conception of Isaac).

Such stories are less frequent in Judaism, but there too there was a widespread belief in angels and divine intervention in births. Theologically, the two accounts mark the moment when Jesus becomes the Son of God, i.e., at his birth, in distinction to Mark, for whom the Sonship dates from Jesus's baptism, and Paul and the pre-Pauline Christians for whom Jesus becomes the Son only at the Resurrection or even the Second Coming.

Tales of virgin birth and the impregnation of mortal women by deities were well known in the 1st-century Greco-Roman world, and Second Temple Jewish works were also capable of producing accounts of the appearances of angels and miraculous births for ancient heroes such as Melchizedek, Noah, and Moses. Luke's virgin birth story is a standard plot from the Jewish scriptures, as for example in the annunciation scenes for Isaac and for Samson, in which an angel appears and causes apprehension, the angel gives reassurance and announces the coming birth, the mother raises an objection, and the angel gives a sign. Nevertheless, "plausible sources that tell of virgin birth in areas convincingly close to the gospels' own probable origins have proven extremely hard to demonstrate". Similarly, while it is widely accepted that there is a connection with Zoroastrian (Persian) sources underlying Matthew's story of the Magi (the wise men from the East) and the Star of Bethlehem, a wider claim that Zoroastrianism formed the background to the infancy narratives has not achieved acceptance.

Historicity and sources of the narratives

The modern scholarly consensus is that the doctrine of the virgin birth rests on very slender historical foundations. Both Matthew and Luke are late and anonymous compositions dating from the period AD 80–100. The earliest Christian writings, the Pauline epistles, do not contain any mention of a virgin birth and assume Jesus's full humanity, stating that he was "born of a woman" like any other human being and "born under the law" like any Jew. In the Gospel of Mark, dating from around AD 70, we read of Jesus saying that "prophets are not without honour, except in their home town, and among their own kin, and in their own house" – , which suggests that Mark was not aware of any tradition of special circumstances surrounding Jesus' birth, and while the author of the gospel of John is confident that Jesus is more than human he makes no reference to a virgin birth to prove his point. John in fact refers twice to Jesus as the "son of Joseph," the first time from the lips of the disciple Philip ("We have found him about whom Moses in the law and also the prophets wrote, Jesus, son of Joseph from Nazareth" – ), the second from the unbelieving Jews ("Is this not Jesus, the son of Joseph, whose mother and father we know?" – John ). These quotations, incidentally, are in direct opposition to the suggestion that Jesus was, or was believed to be, illegitimate: Philip and the Jews know that Jesus had a human father, and that father was Joseph.

This raises the question of where the authors of Matthew and Luke found their stories. It is almost certain that neither was the work of an eyewitness. In view of the many inconsistencies between them neither is likely to derive from the other, nor did they share a common source. Raymond E. Brown suggested in 1973 that Joseph was the source of Matthew's account and Mary of Luke's, but modern scholars consider this "highly unlikely" given that the stories emerged so late. It follows that the two narratives were created by the two writers, drawing on ideas in circulation at least a decade before the gospels were composed, to perhaps 65-75 or even earlier.

Matthew presents the ministry of Jesus as largely the fulfilment of prophecies from the Book of Isaiah, and Matthew 1:22-23, "All this took place to fulfill what had been spoken by the Lord through the prophet: "Look, the virgin shall conceive and bear a son...", is a reference to Isaiah 7:14, "...the Lord himself shall give you a sign: the maiden is with child and she will bear a son..." But in the time of Jesus the Jews of Palestine no longer spoke Hebrew, Isaiah was translated into Greek, and Matthew uses the Greek word parthenos, which does mean virgin, for the Hebrew almah, which scholars agree signifies a girl of childbearing age without reference to virginity. This mistranslation gave the author of Matthew the opportunity to interpret Jesus as the prophesied Immanuel, God is with us, the divine representative on earth.

Theology and development
Matthew and Luke use the virgin birth (or more accurately the divine conception that precedes it) to mark the moment when Jesus becomes the Son of God. This was a notable development over Mark, for whom the Sonship dates from Jesus's baptism,  and the earlier Christianity of Paul and the pre-Pauline Christians for whom Jesus becomes the Son at the Resurrection or even the Second Coming. The Ebionites, a Jewish Christian sect, saw Jesus as fully human, rejected the virgin birth, and preferred to translate almah as "young woman". The 2nd century gnostic theologian Marcion likewise rejected the virgin birth, but regarded Jesus as descended fully formed from heaven and having only the appearance of humanity. By about AD 180 Jews were telling how Jesus had been illegitimately conceived by a Roman soldier named Pantera or Pandera, whose name is likely a pun on parthenos, virgin. The story was still current in the Middle Ages in satirical parody of the Christian gospels called the Toledot Yeshu. The Toledot Yeshu contains little historical material, and was probably created as a tool for warding off conversions to Christianity.

The virgin birth was subsequently accepted by Christians as the proof of the divinity of Jesus, but its rebuttal during and after the 18th century European Enlightenment led some to redefine it as mythical, while others reaffirmed it in dogmatic terms. This division remains in place, although some national synods of the Catholic Church have replaced a biological understanding with the idea of "theological truth", and some evangelical theologians hold it to be marginal rather than indispensable to the Christian faith.

Celebrations and devotions

Christians celebrate the conception of Jesus on 25 March and his birth on 25 December. (These dates are traditional; no one knows for certain when Jesus was born.) The Magnificat, based on Luke 1:46-55 is one of four well known Gospel canticles: the Benedictus and the Magnificat in the first chapter, and the Gloria in Excelsis and the Nunc dimittis in the second chapter of Luke, which are now an integral part of the Christian liturgical tradition. The Annunciation became an element of Marian devotions in medieval times, and by the 13th century direct references to it were widespread in French lyrics. The Eastern Orthodox Church uses the title "Ever Virgin Mary" as a key element of its Marian veneration, and as part of the Akathists hymns to Mary which are an integral part of its liturgy.

The doctrine is often represented in Christian art in terms of the annunciation to Mary by the Archangel Gabriel that she would conceive a child to be born the Son of God, and in Nativity scenes that include the figure of Salome. The Annunciation is one of the most frequently depicted scenes in Western art. Annunciation scenes also amount to the most frequent appearances of Gabriel in medieval art. The depiction of Joseph turning away in some Nativity scenes is a discreet reference to the fatherhood of the Holy Spirit, and the virgin birth.

In Islam

The Quran follows the apocryphal gospels, and especially in the Protoevangelium of James, in its accounts of the miraculous births of both Mary and her son Jesus, but while it affirms the virgin birth of Jesus it denies the Trinitarian implications of the gospel story (Jesus is a messenger of God but also a human being and not the Second Person of the Christian Trinity). Surah , for example, follows the Protoevangelium closely when describing how the pregnant "wife of Imran" (that is, Mary's mother Anne) dedicates her unborn child to God, Mary's secluded upbringing within the Temple, and the angels who bring her food.

Gallery

See also
 Adoptionism
 Almah
 Christology
 Denial of the virgin birth of Jesus
 Immaculate Conception of Mary
 Incarnation (Christianity)
 Isaiah 7:14
 Perpetual virginity of Mary
 Parthenogenesis

References

Citations

Bibliography

 
  
  
 
 
 
   
    
     
 
      
 
 
 
 
 
 
 
 
 
 
 
 
 
 
 
 
 
 
 
   
      
 
         
 
       
       
       
      
      
 
 
   
   
 
 
 

 
 
 
 
 
 
  
 
 
 
 
 
 
 
 
 
 
 
 
 
 
 
 

 

Christianity and Islam
Christology
Gospel of Luke
Gospel of Matthew
Islamic belief and doctrine
Mary, mother of Jesus
New Testament miracles
Gabriel
Holy Spirit